"Trash" is the first single from English rock band Suede's third studio album, Coming Up (1996). Released on 29 July 1996 via Nude Records, "Trash" was the first single on which all the songs were written without guitarist Bernard Butler, since Richard Oakes had taken his place. The single is tied with "Stay Together" as the band's highest-charting single on the UK Singles Chart, peaking at number three; however, it outsold the earlier single, thus making it their biggest-selling single. Outside the UK, the song topped the Finnish Singles Chart in late August and reached the top five in Denmark, Iceland, and Sweden.

Song meaning
Various meanings have been given to the song, but the main themes seem to be about 'outsiders', being different but living well with it. In a 2013 interview, Anderson expanded this theme, saying: "It's a song that's kind of about being in the band and, by extension, it's a song about the fans and the whole kind of ethos of being a Suede... person." He also described it as the soundtrack to his life, saying "It's about believing in the romance of the everyday." In an interview in late 2009, for the SkyArts' Songbook series, Anderson said about the song:

Critical reception
The song proved to be a successful comeback single for Suede, receiving praise from critics. Kevin Courtney of The Irish Times said it is "probably their most direct and immediate pop statement to date." Melody Maker had proclaimed the song "single of the week" a fortnight prior to release. Tania Branigan called it "bitterly sweet, a love song for strangers; fast, in every sense of the word." In reference to the single's B-sides, she said: "In the finest 'Drowners' tradition, the two B-sides are almost finer." Pan-European magazine Music & Media wrote, "They haven't lost their camp, dramatic touch (piped strings!), distorted guitars and strong melodies. Great summer record." Music Week rated it five out of five, and also they picked it as Single of the Week. The reviewer noted, "This return single finds Suede at their most flamboyant with Brett Anderson's deliciously Bowie-like vocals stealing the show over an adventurous arrangement. This should be their biggest hit to date and augurs very well for their September album." The magazine's Alan Jones declared it "their most disciplined and direct pop nugget to date", "hugely commercial, and likely to be their biggest hit yet." Ted Kessler of NME said, "So the scaremongers were wrong. Brett Anderson is the creative force behind Suede. Here's the proof: this week sees the release of their first post-Bernard Butler single and nobody can really admit that they thought it would sound half as good as it does." James Bennett of The Telegraph called it an "instant, flawless, three-minute essence-of-pop, as irresistible as 'Satisfaction' or 'Ride a White Swan'." George Byrne of the Irish Independent had high praise for the single, writing: "The four songs which make up the 'Trash' EP (Nude) are the most uncluttered and focused since their first three singles, dipping back into glam rock with a vengeance. The title track is glorious, a robust romp with a keyboard intro reminiscent of Bowie's 'Heroes' as Anderson leerily lolls with the lyrical lowlife."

Music video
The music video for the song was filmed at Elstree Studios and directed by David Mould. It features the whole band performing in a crowded, up-market bar decorated in  garish primary colours among people in glamorous, high-end fashions of the day. The video also marks the first appearance of a new band member, keyboard player Neil Codling.

Accolades
A 2014 poll by US music magazine Paste marking the 20th anniversary of Britpop listed "Trash" at number 14 in its list, "The 50 Best Britpop Songs." Michael Danaher wrote: "The song is a festering, anthemic pop gem that featuring a glorious chorus and guitar and synth-driven rhythm. A vastly underrated song this side of the Atlantic." In a public poll by NME, "Trash" was placed at number nine on its list of the "50 Greatest Britpop Songs Ever", saying: "with 'Trash', Suede made being a glam weirdo seem like the most appealing thing in the world."

Versions
A different version of the song appears on the group's 2003 compilation album Singles, where the vocals were re-recorded along with an alternative ending. All four of the singles' B-sides were included on Suede's compilation Sci-Fi Lullabies, which was released the following year, although the version of "Europe is our Playground" was a new version and not the original B-side version found here. "Europe is Our Playground" also marks the songwriting debut of bass guitarist Mat Osman.

A cover of "Trash" is featured on the 2009 album Rocket Science by Norwegian electro-rock band Apoptygma Berzerk.

Track listings
All songs were written by Brett Anderson and Richard Oakes except where noted.

UK 7-inch and cassette single
 "Trash"
 "Europe Is Our Playground" (Anderson, Mat Osman)

UK CD1 and Australian CD single
 "Trash"
 "Europe Is Our Playground" (Anderson, Osman)
 "Every Monday Morning Comes"

UK CD2
 "Trash"
 "Have You Ever Been This Low?"
 "Another No-One" (Anderson)

European maxi-CD single
 "Trash"
 "Europe Is Our Playground" (Anderson, Osman)
 "Every Monday Morning Comes"
 "Another No-One" (Anderson)

Japanese EP
 "Trash"
 "Europe Is Our Playground" (Anderson, Osman)
 "Every Monday Morning Comes"
 "Have You Ever Been This Low?"
 "Another No One" (Anderson)

Charts and certifications

Weekly charts

Year-end charts

Certifications

References

1996 singles
1996 songs
Number-one singles in Finland
Song recordings produced by Ed Buller
Songs written by Brett Anderson
Songs written by Richard Oakes (guitarist)
Suede (band) songs